Messa di Orfeo is the twentieth and last album by Popol Vuh. It was originally released in 1999 on Spalax and features music played during an audio-video-light installation as performed in the Labyrinth of Molfetta, Bari, during the Time Zones Festival in 1998.

Track listing 
All tracks composed by Florian Fricke.

 "Deep in the Ocean of Love" – 2:50
 "Strofa 1" – 3:37
 "Nascita dell' ape" – 7:18
 "Strofa 2" – 3:45
 "Dall' origine al divenire" – 2:15
 "Strofa 3" – 4:05
 "Strofa 4" – 3:49
 "Primo movimento" – 13:41
 "Strofa 5" – 3:48

Personnel 
Florian Fricke – keyboards
Frank Fiedler – video
Guillermina De Gennaro – recitation
Maya Rose – vocals
Johannes Fricke – artist assistance

Credits 
Live recording by Popol Vuh 
Studio recording at Tom Tom-Studio, Bari, Italy 
Produced by Popol Vuh and Time Zones

Liner notes 
The liner notes of the album are in Italian. 

Original text in Italian 

Orfeo, il bardo, fa parte degli argonauti 
Oiagros, dio del fiume, suo padre 
Calliope, la musa, sua madre 
I suoi emblemi sono l'ape e la cicala, animali divini, amici delle muse

Translation in English 

Orpheus, the bard, part of the Argonauts 
Oeagrus, god of the river, his father 
Calliope, the Muse, his mother 
His emblems are the bee and the grasshopper, divine animals, friends of the Muses

Lyrics 

Original in Italian 

La terra ed io siamo uno 
i suoi occhi ed i miei occhi sono uno 
le sue orecchie e le mie orecchie sono uno
  
La terra ed io siamo uno 
le sue ossa e le mie ossa sono uno
  
La terra ed io siamo uno 
la sua carne e la mia carne sono uno
  
La terra ed io siamo uno 
il suo sangue ed il mio sangue sono uno
  
La terra ed io siamo uno 
il suo respiro ed il mio respiro sono uno 
La terra mi tiene e mi ama da sempre

Translation in English 

The Earth and I are one 
His eyes and my eyes are one 
His ears and my ears are one

The Earth and I are one 
His bones and my bones are one

The Earth and I are one 
His flesh and my flesh are one

The Earth and I are one 
His blood and my blood are one

The Earth and I are one 
His breath and my breath are one 
The Earth always holds me and loves me

External links 
 https://web.archive.org/web/20081029050641/http://www.furious.com/perfect/populvuh.html (Comprehensive article & review of every album)
 https://web.archive.org/web/20080119183134/http://www.enricobassi.it/popvuhdiscografia90.htm (featuring the original credits)
 http://www.venco.com.pl/~acrux/messa.htm
 

Popol Vuh (band) albums
1999 live albums